Ann-Marie MacDonald  (born October 29, 1958) is a Canadian playwright, author, actress, and broadcast host who lives in Toronto, Ontario. MacDonald is the daughter of a member of Canada's military; she was born at an air force base near Baden-Baden, West Germany.  She is of partial Lebanese descent through her mother.

Life and career
MacDonald won the Commonwealth Writers Prize for her first novel, Fall on Your Knees (1996), which was selected for Oprah Winfrey's Book Club in January 2002. MacDonald received the Governor General's Award for Drama, the Floyd S. Chalmers Canadian Play Award, and the Canadian Authors Association Drama Award for her play, Goodnight Desdemona (Good Morning Juliet). MacDonald hosted the CBC documentary series Life and Times for seven seasons. MacDonald also hosted CBC's flagship documentary program, Doc Zone for eight seasons. She appeared in the films I've Heard the Mermaids Singing and Better Than Chocolate, among others.

MacDonald's 2003 novel, The Way the Crow Flies, was partly inspired by the Steven Truscott case. Her third novel Adult Onset was released in 2014 and has been translated into five languages. Her fourth novel Fayne was published in 2022.

She was the inaugural Mordecai Richler Reading Room Writer in Residence at Concordia University, and she coaches students in the Acting and Playwriting Programs at the National Theatre School of Canada.

In 2008, MacDonald was awarded an honorary doctorate of humanities by the University of Windsor.

In May 2015, MacDonald was the "big-name author" and "public face" of the inaugural Canadian Authors for Indies Day, organized to bring attention to independent bookstores across the country. Nearly 100 stores and 270 authors participated in the nationwide event.

In December 2018, MacDonald was named as an Officer of the Order of Canada, in recognition of "her multi-faceted contributions to the arts in Canada and for her advocacy of LGBTQ+ and women's rights".

MacDonald is married to the Canadian playwright and theatre director Alisa Palmer.

Works

Theatre
 This is For You, Anna - 1983 (play, collective creation)
 Nancy Drew, The Case of the Missing Mother - 1984 (play, co-authored with Beverley Cooper)
 Clue in the Fast Lane - 1985 (play, co-authored with Beverley Cooper)
 Goodnight Desdemona (Good Morning Juliet) – 1988 (play)
 The Arab's Mouth – 1990 (play)
 Nigredo Hotel – 1992 (opera libretto)
 The Attic, the Pearls and Three Fine Girls – 1995 (play, co-authored with Jennifer Brewin, Martha Ross, Leah Cherniak, and Alisa Palmer)
 Anything That Moves – 2000 (book and lyrics for musical)
 Belle Moral – 2005 (play; a substantially revised version of The Arab's Mouth (above))

Novels
 Fall on Your Knees (1996)
 The Way the Crow Flies (2003) 
 Adult Onset (2014)
 Fayne (2022)

Filmography

Films
 The Wars (1983)
 Unfinished Business (1984)
 I've Heard the Mermaids Singing (1987)
 Where the Spirit Lives (1989)
 Where the Heart Is (1990)
 Paint Cans (1994)
 Getting Away with Murder (1996)
 Better Than Chocolate (1999)
 The Girlfriend Interviews (short, 2001)
 Interviews with My Next Girlfriend (short, 2002)

Television (as actress or host)
 Rubberface (TV movie, 1981)
 Mafia Princess (TV movie, 1986)
 Hot Shots (TV series, 1986)
 Airwolf (TV series, 1987)
 Adderly (TV series, 1987)
 Captain Power and the Soldiers of the Future (TV series, 1987)
 Alfred Hitchcock Presents (TV series, 1987–1989)
 Diamonds (TV series, 1988)
 Rin Tin Tin: K-9 Cop (TV series, 1988–1991)
 Street Legal (TV series, 1990)
 Beyond Reality (TV series, 1991–1992)
 E.N.G. (TV series, 1992–1993)
 Shattered Trust: The Shari Karney Story (TV movie, 1993)
 The Babymaker: The Dr. Cecil Jacobson Story (TV movie, 1994)
 Due South (TV series, 1995)
 Friends at Last (TV movie, 1995)
 Her Desperate Choice (TV movie, 1996)
 Life and Times (TV documentary series host, 1996–2006)
 Too Close to Home (TV movie, 1997)
 A Taste of Shakespeare (TV series, 1997)
 The Industry (TV series, 2003)
 The Unsexing of Emma Edmonds (TV movie, 2004)
 The L Word (TV series, 2006)
 Slings & Arrows (TV series, 2006)
 Doc Zone (TV documentary series host, 2009–2015)

Television (as writer)
 Street Legal (TV series, 1988)
 Beyond Reality (TV series, 1992)
 Ready or Not (TV series, 1994–1995)

See also

 List of Canadian writers
 List of Canadian playwrights

References

External links
 Ann-Marie MacDonald official website
 Ann-Marie MacDonald's entry in The Canadian Encyclopedia
 
 Publisher's official website

1958 births
Living people
Canadian women dramatists and playwrights
Canadian film actresses
Canadian women novelists
Canadian television hosts
Governor General's Award-winning dramatists
Canadian lesbian actresses
Canadian lesbian writers
Canadian LGBT broadcasters
20th-century Canadian novelists
21st-century Canadian novelists
Canadian LGBT dramatists and playwrights
Canadian LGBT novelists
Officers of the Order of Canada
People from Baden-Baden
Canadian television journalists
20th-century Canadian dramatists and playwrights
21st-century Canadian dramatists and playwrights
20th-century Canadian women writers
21st-century Canadian women writers
Canadian people of Lebanese descent
Canadian expatriates in Germany
Expatriate actresses in Germany
Canadian women television personalities
Canadian women television journalists
Canadian women television hosts
Best Supporting Actress in a Drama Series Canadian Screen Award winners
21st-century Canadian LGBT people
Lesbian dramatists and playwrights
Lesbian novelists